Capps may refer to:

Places

United States
 Mount Capps, Alaska
 Capps, Arkansas, an unincorporated community
 Capps, Florida, a small town
 Capps, Missouri, an unincorporated community

Other uses
 USS Capps (DD-550), a U.S. Navy destroyer
 Capps (surname), people with the surname Capps
 Computer-Assisted Passenger Prescreening System, a U.S. airport security program
 Computer Assisted Passenger Prescreening System II, a later version of CAPPS

See also

 
 
 Capp (disambiguation)
 Caps (disambiguation)